A soft drink is a beverage that typically contains carbonated water, one or more flavourings and sweeteners such as sugar, HFCS, fruit juices, and/or sugar substitutes such as sucralose, acesulfame-K, aspartame and cyclamate. Soft drinks may also contain caffeine, colorings, preservatives and other ingredients.

Flavors

 Almond – common mixed flavor in many drinks, also the primary flavor for brands like Suburban Club sodas such as Almond Smash. Almond-flavored soft drinks are sometimes prepared using orgeat syrup.

 Apple – Fassbrause is a non-alcoholic or alcoholic (depending on the brand) German drink made from fruit and spices and malt extract, traditionally stored in a keg. It often has an apple flavor. 
Apple Sidra is a non-alcoholic drink from Taiwan. It is not a Cider as the name may imply, but a carbonated soda with an Apple flavour.
Apple Beer is a non-alcoholic American variant of fassbrause, produced by The Apple Beer Corporation in Salt Lake City. Aspen Soda was an apple-flavored soda sold across the United States by PepsiCo from 1978 until 1982.  In 1984, PepsiCo came out with a replacement apple soda under its new Slice line.
 Apricot
 Birch Beer
 Blackberry – like those made by Izze
 Brazil nut
 Butterscotch – brands of butterscotch-flavored soda include O-SO Butterscotch Root Beer produced by Orca Beverage Inc., Dang Butterscotch root beer
 Celery – Cel-Ray produced by Dr. Brown's of New York City
 Champagne cola – class of sodas, with a color lighter than cola and darker than cream soda, and flavors similar to both
 Cherry cola – brands include Coca-Cola Cherry, Pepsi Wild Cherry, and Cherry RC, among others.
 Cherry soda – brands of cherry-flavored soda include 7 Up, Cherikee Red, IBC Black Cherry, Cheerwine, and Crush, among others.
 Cherryade – soft drinks prepared with cherry juice.
 Chocolate – for example, Canfield's Diet Chocolate Fudge and Yoo-hoo
 Citron – an example is Cedrata Tassoni, an Italian, citron-flavored soft drink brand
 Clementine – made by Izze
 Cola – originally contained caffeine from the kola nut and cocaine from coca leaves, and was flavored with vanilla and other ingredients. Most colas now use other flavoring (and caffeinating) ingredients with a similar taste and no longer contain cocaine. It became popular worldwide after pharmacist John Pemberton invented Coca-Cola in 1886.
 Cranberry – used as flavoring, for example, Sprite Winter Spiced Cranberry and Canada Dry Cranberry Ginger Ale
 Cream soda – often flavored with vanilla, such as Big Red
 Cucumber soda – type of soda made by various manufacturers including Mr. Q. Cumber. Pepsi offers an ice cucumber flavor in some markets.
 Dandelion and burdock – popular favorite within the UK since the middle ages. Popular brands include Ben Shaws owned by Cotts of Canada
 Gentiana – such as Moxie

 Ginger ale – carbonated soft drink flavored with ginger in one of two ways. The golden style is closer to the ginger beer original, and is credited to the American doctor Thomas Cantrell. The dry style (also called the pale style) is a paler drink with a much milder ginger-flavor to it, and was created by Canadian John McLaughlin.
 Ginger beer – produced in two versions: brewed ginger beer (which includes home-brewed) or a carbonated drink flavored primarily with ginger and sweetened with sugar or artificial sweeteners.
 Grape soda – grape-flavored soft drinks and sodas
 Grapefruit – brands of grapefruit-flavored soda include Fresca, Ting, Pelmosoda and Squirt, among others.
 Guarana – carbonated soft drinks with guarana are produced and marketed in Latin American countries.
 Guava – such as Jarritos brand
 Irn-Bru – citrus-based soft drink that is popular in Scotland
Lavender
 Lemon – liquid derived from the outer skin of lemons may be used to flavor soft drinks, other beverages and foods. Brands of lemon-flavored soda include Coca-Cola with Lemon, Gini and Solo, among others. "Lemonade" in the United Kingdom and other Commonwealth countries, or limonada in Mexico, may refer to carbonated lemon-flavored soda as well as the non-carbonated version.
 Lemon-lime – common carbonated soft drink flavor, consisting of lemon and lime flavoring, such as 7 Up, Sprite, and Sierra Mist
 Lemon verbena (Hierba Luisa) – such as Inca Kola

 Lime – such as limeade
 Litchi

 Malt – such as Malta, which is a brewed, carbonated malt beverage that is not fermented, and hence non-alcoholic
 Mandarin orange – examples include sodas produced by Maine Root Handcrafted Beverages, Slice and Goya
 Mango – such as Jarritos brand
 Mate – such as Club-Mate, a caffeinated soda made with Yerba Mate extract, based on mate, an infusion of Yerba mate.

 Melon – Mello Yello produced a melon soda called Mello Yello Melon. It was discontinued. It is a popular flavor in Japan.
 Mulberry
 Nectarine – made by Izze

 Orange soft drink – sometimes referred to as orangeade
 Papaya – such as the discontinued product by Izze
 Passionfruit – such as Passiona, sold only in Australia. There was also a brand of Fanta produced in Brazil with the flavor, selected by the customers in a contest.
 Peach –  such as Big Peach or Nehi Peach
 Pear – such as the previous product by Izze
 "Pepper" flavor, a proprietary mix of Dr. Pepper, with the original Mr. Pibb positioned as a competitor in this flavor category

 Pineapple – brands of pineapple-flavored soda include Fanta, Sun Crest, The Pop Shoppe and Jarritos, among others.
 Pomegranate – such as Hansen's

 Raspberry – may be referred to as raspberryade in the United Kingdom. Similar soft drinks are also known as raspberry soda in other parts of the world.
 Root beer – originally made using the root of the sassafras plant (or the bark of a sassafras tree) as the primary flavor.
 Elder or elderberry – used in soft drinks such as socată
 Salak is usually used in sodas in Thailand, commonly mistaken for Strawberry

 Sarsaparilla – originally made from the Smilax regelii plant. Nowadays, sodas with this flavor are sometimes made with artificial flavors.
 Shirley Temple
 Spruce beer is a beverage flavored with the buds, needles, or essence of spruce trees. In the Canadian provinces of Newfoundland and Quebec, it is known in French as bière d'épinette. Spruce beer may refer to either an artificially flavored non-alcoholic carbonated soft drink, or to genuine spruce beer.

 Strawberry – brands of strawberry-flavored soda include Catawissa Bottling Company, Stewart's Fountain Classics, Goody Strawberry and Vess, among others. Strawberry soda can also be marketed as Red Pop.

 Tamarind – such as Jarritos Tamarindo
 Tarragon – for example Tarhun.
 Watermelon – such as Jarritos brand

Specialty
 Bludwine / Budwine – brand of cherry-flavored soft drink that was produced in the United States by the Bludwine Company and Bludwine Bottling Company. In 1921, the company changed the name of the soft drink product from Bludwine to Budwine. Production of Budwine stopped in the mid-1990s. As of 2009, the brand was in existence and run by two entrepreneurs in Georgia.
 Dandelion and burdock – consumed in the British Isles since the Middle Ages. It was originally a type of light mead, but over the years has evolved into the non-alcoholic soft drink commercially available today. Fentimans produces a variety of this drink.
 Bacon soda – soft drink beverage that has the flavor of bacon. Several U.S. companies produce bacon soda brands, including Jones Soda, Lockhart Smokehouse and Rocket Fizz.
 Buffalo wing – produced by Rocket Fizz
 Coffee – produced by Rocket Fizz
 Julebrus – Norwegian soft drink, usually with a festive label on the bottle. It is brewed by most Norwegian breweries, as a Christmas drink for minors, who aren't eligible (by law) to enjoy the traditional juleøl (English: Christmas Ale), but is also very popular among adults as well.
 Open-source cola – any cola soft drink produced according to an open-sourced recipe
 PepperElixir, – produced by Orca Beverage Inc.
 Ranch dressing – produced by Rocket Fizz
 Squash – non-alcoholic concentrated syrup mixed with water or carbonated water to create a soft drink

See also

 Frozen carbonated beverage
 Ice cream soda
 List of brand name soft drink products
 List of orange soft drink brands
 List of soft drink producers
 List of soft drinks by country
 Non-alcoholic beverage
 Sports drink

References

External links
 
 

Lists of drinks